Rebel in Paradise: A Biography of Emma Goldman is a 1961 biography of Emma Goldman by historian Richard Drinnon.

Bibliography 

 
 
 
 
 
 
 
 

1961 non-fiction books
Biographies of Emma Goldman
English-language books
University of Chicago Press books